Amaram is a 1991 Indian Malayalam drama film directed by Bharathan and written by A. K. Lohithadas. It stars Mammootty, Maathu, K. P. A. C. Lalitha, Ashokan, Murali, Chitra, and Kuthiravattam Pappu in the main roles. The film's score is composed by Johnson while the songs are by Raveendran.

K. P. A. C. Lalitha won the National Film Award for Best Supporting Actress for her role as Bhargavi. And Mammotty won the Filmfare Awards South Best Actor Award for his role. The film was a critical and commercial success and is considered as a classic in Malayalam Cinema. It ran for more than 200 days in Ragam theater, Thrissur and ran over 50 days in Safire (Madras) theater.

Plot 
Achootty, a fisherman lives with his daughter, Radha. The uneducated Achootty wants his daughter to be educated and also wants her to become a doctor. His dreams get shattered when she falls in love with her childhood friend Raghavan. One fine day Radha and Raghavan elope and get married. Achootty does not like his son-in-law initially and in disappointment does not talk to his daughter either. But slowly the young chap shows that he is an able and hard-working fisherman and gains Achootty's silent admiration. Achooty does not acknowledge this publicly, but keeps heckling his son-in-law in public, taunting him to catch a shark and prove himself before he dares talk to Achooty. One day, Raghavan decides he's had enough of the taunting and goes to the deep sea to capture a shark. But he is inexperienced, and in a fit of daring goes out alone in his catamaran. When he does not return, people think that Achootty killed him at sea since Achootty had also been to the sea that day.

It is a stormy night and everyone is afraid of going to the sea to search for him. At this point, Achootty's daughter also feels that her father has killed her husband. Having nothing to lose, Achootty goes to the sea and he sees Raghavan lying unconscious on the remains of his boat which is wrecked. Achootty rescues him and brings him back to the shore. Everyone understands Achootty's innocence but he feels let down by them. In the end, Achootty takes his boat and ventures into the sea, saying that is the only entity that has loved him unconditionally.

Cast
Mammootty as Achootty, an uneducated fisherman.
Maathu as Radha/Muthhu, the only daughter of Achootty, whom he wishes to be a doctor.
Murali as Kochu Raman ,Raghavan's father 
Ashokan as Raghavan, Radha's love interest, Jeevan John as young Raghavan
KPAC Lalitha as Bhargavi , Raghavan's mother 
Chithra as Chandrika,Kochuraman's sister 
Balan K. Nair as Pillaichan
Kuthiravattam Pappu as Raman Kutty
Zainuddin as Damodaran

Crew
voice-artists

Music 
The film score was composed by Johnson. The film's soundtrack contains 4 songs composed by Raveendran. The lyrics were written by Kaithapram Damodaran Namboothiri. The song  "Hridaya Raga Thanthri" is based on 	"Humko Man Ki Shakti Dena" from Guddi.

Awards

38th National Film Awards
 Best Supporting Actress - KPAC Lalitha

Kerala State Film Awards
 Second Best Actor - Murali
 Second Best Actress - KPAC Lalitha
 Best Cinematography - Madhu Ambat

Filmfare Awards South
 Best Actor (Malayalam) - Mammootty

References

External links 
 

1991 films
1990s Malayalam-language films
Films directed by Bharathan
1991 drama films
Films featuring a Best Supporting Actress National Film Award-winning performance
Films with screenplays by A. K. Lohithadas
Films scored by Raveendran
Indian drama films